The Southwest China vole (Eothenomys custos) is a species of rodent in the family Cricetidae. It is found only in Yunnan and Sichuan, China. It occurs in Cangshan Erhai Nature Reserve.

References

Musser, G. G. and M. D. Carleton. 2005. Superfamily Muroidea. pp. 894–1531 in Mammal Species of the World a Taxonomic and Geographic Reference. D. E. Wilson and D. M. Reeder eds. Johns Hopkins University Press, Baltimore.

Eothenomys
Rodents of China
Mammals described in 1912
Taxa named by Oldfield Thomas
Taxonomy articles created by Polbot